Mariano Arana (born March 6, 1933, in Montevideo) is an Uruguayan architect and politician, former Minister of Housing, Spatial Planning and Environment of Uruguay and former mayor of Montevideo.

Biography

Son and grandson of Spanish immigrants, Arana attended the Lycée Français de Montevideo and is a graduate of the Faculty of Architecture of the University of the Republic. He was also teacher and Director of the Institute of History of Architecture, among the many other activities during college.

He was founder of the Banda Oriental Editions and was chairman of the Comisión de Patrimonio Histórico, Artístico y Cultural de la Nación between 1985 and 1989.

He has written numerous books, ranging from architecture to politics. On the latter subject is his latest book, written jointly with Prof. Oscar Destouet, entitled 5 Vertientes de la Izquierda (5 Slopes of the Left), which is a compilation of information from publications of five leading thinkers of the Uruguayan left: Oscar Bruschera (history teacher), Peter Seré (lawyer, consultant of Liber Seregni), Reina Reyes (teacher), Mario Kaplun (communicator) and Hector Rodriguez (trade unionist, member of the guild of tailors).

Political Activity

He is founder and current leader of the Vertiente Artiguista (Artiguista Movement), in whose list he was elected senator in 1989, a position he held until 1994, currently held by Eleonora Bianchi. Arana was chairman of the Plenario Departamental de Montevideo of the Frente Amplio and was a candidate for the Frente Amplio in the Municipality of Montevideo in 1984 and again in 1994, an occasion on which he was elected Mayor with 42% of votes; subsequently he was re-elected in the municipal elections of May 2000 with  58% of the total votes cast.

During his performance as mayor, he implemented the Strategic Plan Montevideo, a plan to renovate the facades of edifices and reorder urban areas of the city.

When Tabaré Vázquez assumed the presidency in 2005, he was appointed Minister of Housing, Territorial Planning and Environment, accompanied by his colleague, undersecretary Jaime Igorra. He served until March 1, 2008, and was succeeded at that time by Carlos Colacce.

References

1933 births
Living people
Intendants of Montevideo
Ministers of Housing, Territorial Planning and Environment of Uruguay
Members of the Senate of Uruguay
People from Montevideo
Uruguayan people of Basque descent
Vertiente Artiguista politicians
Broad Front (Uruguay) politicians
Uruguayan architects
Uruguayan architectural historians
University of the Republic (Uruguay) alumni
Academic staff of the University of the Republic (Uruguay)